The 1991 Currie Cup Rural C was the fourth division of the Currie Cup competition, the premier domestic rugby union competition in South Africa. This was the 53rd season since the competition started in 1889.

Teams

Changes between 1990 and 1991 seasons
 The 1990 season was the last edition of the Santam Bank Trophy. Instead, these teams were included in a Currie Cup Rural Division, which had a four-team Division C and a five-team Division D.
  were relegated from 1990 Currie Cup Division B to the 1991 Currie Cup Rural C.
 ,  and  moved to the 1991 Currie Cup Rural C.

Changes between 1991 and 1992 seasons
 The Currie Cup Rural C was renamed Currie Cup Rural A for 1992.

Competition

There were four participating teams in the 1991 Currie Cup Rural C competition. These teams played each other twice over the course of the season, once at home and once away. Teams received two points for a win and one points for a draw. The winner of the Rural C competition played off against the winner of the Rural D competition for the Bankfin Trophy.

In addition, all the Currie Cup Rural C teams also played in the 1991 Currie Cup Central / Rural Series.

Log

Fixtures and results

Round one

Round two

Round three

Round four

Round five

Round six

Final

The winner of the Rural C competition played off against the winner of the Rural D competition for the Bankfin Trophy.

Relegation play-off

In the play-off match,  beat  to clinch a spot in the 1992 Currie Cup Rural A, while  would play in the 1992 Currie Cup Rural B.

See also
 1991 Currie Cup
 1991 Currie Cup / Central Series
 1991 Currie Cup Central A
 1991 Currie Cup Central B
 1991 Currie Cup Central / Rural Series
 1991 Currie Cup Rural D
 1991 Lion Cup

References

C